Saint-Bonnet-de-Four is a commune in the Allier department in Auvergne-Rhône-Alpes in central France.

Population

Sights
Church of Saint Bonnet, with its bent steeple and ornate doors.

The original church dates from the 11th century and is a designated historic monument. In the 14th century, a Gothic chapel was added on the right of the transept.

The steeple was struck by lightning in 1894 and rebuilt from green wood that subsequently warped and became a local curiosity. In 1978, when the church was restored, the requirement that it be rebuilt exactly like the original meant that the 1/8 turn in the steeple had to be maintained.

See also
Communes of the Allier department

References
INSEE commune file (in French)

Communes of Allier
Allier communes articles needing translation from French Wikipedia